= Rhorus =

Scientific classification
- Kingdom: Animalia
- Phylum: Arthropoda
- Class: Insecta
- Order: Hymenoptera
- Family: Ichneumonidae
- Genus: Rhorus; Förster, 1869

Genus of insects

Rhorus is a genus of parasitoid wasps belonging to the family Ichneumonidae.

The species of this genus are found in Europe and Northern America.

Select species:

- Rhorus abnormiceps (Roman, 1909)
- Rhorus alpinator Aubert, 1965
